Václav Slavík (born 23 September 1906, date of death unknown), was a Czech architect. His work was part of the architecture event in the art competition at the 1936 Summer Olympics.

References

1906 births
Year of death missing
20th-century Czech architects
Olympic competitors in art competitions
People from Přeštice